Heraclio Fournier may refer to:

Naipes Heraclio Fournier, S.A., a Spanish playing card manufacturer 
Heraclio Alfaro Fournier (1893-1962), Spanish-born aviator